Kali Prasad Pandey is an Indian politician From The Indian National Congress. He was elected to the Lok Sabha from Gopalganj in Bihar as an Independent politician.

He was previously associated with Indian National Congress from 1969 to 1977 and 1980 to 1984. He was Member of Bihar Legislative Assembly from 1980 to 1984. He was General Secretary Lok Janshakti Party till October 2020 but joined Indian National Congress and got ticket from Kuchaikote seat in 2020 Bihar Legislative Assembly election.

References

1946 births
Living people
People from Gopalganj district, India
Indian National Congress politicians from Bihar
India MPs 1984–1989
Lok Sabha members from Bihar
Members of the Bihar Legislative Assembly
Lok Janshakti Party politicians